Yianna Katsoulos (born September 16, 1960 in Florida, United States) is a pop singer who sings in French. Her single "Les autres sont jaloux" was a top thirty hit in France in 1986. however, her next five singles did not achieve the same success. Katsoulos was also a presenter on television channel FR3. She hosted L’Eurotop a hit parade video show, Une Pêche d’Enfer where she presented fashion & travel tips 5 days a week, Salut Manu where she co-presented with Manu DiBsngo à live music show featuring world renowned artists, Le MIDDEM en Direct de Cannes where she interviewed stars for the annual music festival in Cannes. She was also a guest star on Dessignez C’est Gagné & Surprise, Surprise. Benny Hill and Yianna Katsoulos presented the last Christmas Show FR3 before Benny Hill's death. 

In 2011, she released a single, "Fais-moi l'amour comme un français".

In 2020 she released the 3 part album Only Clubbers Survive with the first single Drunky Talk 2K20.

Discography

Albums
 1997 : Quelque chose dans l'atmosphère
 2004 : Radio promo songs (compilation Best OF)
 2013 : La Reine des Années 80
 2020 : Only Clubbers Survive (3 part album)

Singles
 1986 : "Les autres sont jaloux" – No. 17 in France and a hit in Belgium & Switzerland, & Canada & Morocco 
 1987 : "Rien n'est pour toujours"
 1988 : "Plus fort que les gâteaux"
 1989 : "Salade de fruit"
 1990 : "Faites pour un Millionnaire"
 1997 : "Quelque chose dans l'atmosphère"
 2003 : "Mademoiselle Street" (promotional single)
 2004 : "Chacun pour soi" (promotional single)
 2011 : "Fais-moi l'amour comme un français" – rock version & dance club version 
 2020 : "Drunky Talk 2K20"

References

External links
 Official site

1960 births
American emigrants to France
Living people
People from Florida
French women pop singers